This is a list of museums in Trentino-Alto Adige/Südtirol, Italy.

References 

Trentino-Alto Adige Südtirol